Copper Creek is a stream in Sauk County, Wisconsin, in the United States.

Copper Creek was named from deposits of copper ore that were mined there.

See also
List of rivers of Wisconsin

References

Rivers of Sauk County, Wisconsin
Rivers of Wisconsin